São Tomé and Príncipe is an island country off the coast of west Africa. The two main islands are São Tomé Island and  Príncipe. An incomplete list of the other, smaller islands: 

 Ilhéu Bom Bom
 Ilhéu das Cabras
 Ilhéu Caroço
 Ilhéu Gabado
 Ilhéu dos Mosteiros
 Pedra da Galé
 Ilhéu Quixibá
 Ilhéu das Rolas
 Ilhéu de Santana
 Ilhéu de São Miguel
 Sete Pedras
 Tinhosa Grande
 Tinhosa Pequena

Sao Tome And Principe
Lists of landforms of São Tomé and Príncipe